Kazi Keramat Ali (born 22 April 1954) is a Bangladeshi politician. He is a former State Minister for Technical and Madrasa Education from January 2018 until January 2019. He is the incumbent Jatiya Sangsad member from the Rajbari-1 constituency since 2009.

Background and career
In 1991, Ali became the general secretary of the Bangladesh Awami League’s Rajbari district unit. The next year, he was elected as a member of Jatiya Sangsad. He has been elected for 5th time at the current term.

References

1954 births
Living people
People from Rajbari District
Awami League politicians
5th Jatiya Sangsad members
7th Jatiya Sangsad members
9th Jatiya Sangsad members
10th Jatiya Sangsad members
11th Jatiya Sangsad members
State Ministers of Education (Bangladesh)